Fender Telecaster Custom is a model of electric guitar made by Fender.

History
During the 1950s and early 1960s, Fender's twangy single-coil sound enjoyed considerable popularity. This began to wane by the mid-1960s as new stars like Eric Clapton and Mike Bloomfield plugged their humbucker-equipped Gibsons into over-driven Marshall amplifiers. Many players began to look for a thicker, creamier sound that the standard Telecaster didn't deliver. To achieve this sound, many players replaced the standard single-coil pickups on their Telecasters and installed aftermarket humbuckers (a good example of this is Keith Richards' modified Fender Telecaster nicknamed Micawber). Another reason for replacing the Telecaster neck pickup was that many players felt it lacked a "Rock and Roll vibe". The original single-coil neck pickup excels in jazz and blues tones but players[who?] felt replacing it with a more powerful humbucker pickup would give the Telecaster a second rock voice to match the Telecaster's popular bridge pickup.

The Custom (along with the Thinline and Deluxe models) was an attempt to enter the humbucker market largely dominated by Gibson. Fender's first humbucking design was the Wide Range humbucker created by Seth Lover, who had overseen the development of the original Gibson humbucker. When Lover's association with Gibson came to an end Fender approached him to design a pickup that would enable them to compete with his previous employer. The resulting pick-up first appeared in the Thinline and Deluxe range of Fender Telecasters introduced in 1972. Lover's Fender humbucker is felt by many[who?] to be brighter with more bottom end than his Gibson versions, and a better match for the classic, Fender bridge pickup.

There was a curly "Custom" logo on the original Custom guitar until early 1973 when it was replaced by a standard italicized block typeface as used on most Fender guitars and basses of the time. It was produced from 1972 to 1981. Until the first half of 1977, when the knobs were changed to Stratocaster style knobs, the "Witch-Hat" volume and tone knobs were replaced with Stratocaster knobs. Since Fender used denser wood to create this model, it resulted in an instrument that was significantly heavier than the average Telecaster (nine pounds versus seven pounds on average). This results in a much thicker and less sharply defined sound as a result.

Few well-known players of the time picked up on the Custom apart from Keith Richards, who used one as his main guitar from 1975 until 1983, and Mick Green (guitarist for The Pirates, Johnny Kidd, David Monteverde (guitarist for Goutucucha), Bryan Ferry, Van Morrison, and Paul McCartney) who wielded a natural-finish 'second-version' Custom.

Popularity 
Telecaster Custom was introduced just around the time that Fender began to lose its reputation as a quality instrument company. Blighted with Fender's allegedly unstable 3 bolt adjustable neck joint and the characteristic 1970's-style "notchless" upper cutaway, the Custom was also tarnished by negative perceptions surrounding the Pre / Post-CBS quality control debate.

Were this not enough, the Custom was also more expensive than the standard Telecaster. Despite high hopes, sales never reached the levels that Fender had anticipated.

The Reissue 1972 Telecaster Custom 
As with the other guitars in the '72 reissue series, the Custom has enjoyed much of its popularity long after the cessation of its original production run. Fender Japan was the first to release a reissue of the Custom, which benefited from being substantially lighter than the original and thus less tonally inert. Following the Japanese re-issue, Fender moved production to its Ensenada facility in Mexico - the MIM reissues are now the predominant versions in Europe and the United States. It is generally accepted among players that the Japanese version is superior to the Mexican version in construction, though some believe the Japanese ceramic humbucker suffers in comparison with the Mexican model's Alnico humbucker. The higher-end Factory Special Run (FSR) editions of the guitar are made at the Fender Custom Shop (USA).

Differences: The re-issues and road-worn copies feature a different bridge to the original Telecaster Custom, and re-issues are supplied only in a choice of either black or sunburst. The re-issue body differs from the original in having the deeper upper cutaway characteristic of modern standard Telecasters. Perhaps the most well-known difference is the reissue Wide Range Humbucker pick-up.

Both the Mexican and the Japanese versions feature a reissued version of the Fender Wide Range humbucking pickup, each of which differs fundamentally in construction from the original. The original WRH used magnetized CuNiFe (copper, nickel, and iron) pole pieces ("slugs") with copper wiring around the slugs, while the reissue has a standard non-magnetized set of slugs with an AlNiCo (aluminum, nickel, Cobalt) magnetized bar underneath. This standard humbucker is fitted in the larger casing of the original pickup, using wax to fill the void. The original WRH measured an average of 10.6 kΩ and used a 1 MΩ audio volume pot (P/N 021832) and a 1 MΩ LIN (P/N 010188) tone pot, while the reissue measures a fairly standard 8 kΩ and uses 250 kΩ volume and tone pots. This results in a much darker sounding reissue wide-range pickup.

Criticisms of the reissue Wide Range Humbucker and the escalating cost of parted-out original pick-ups has led to the establishment of a small but thriving aftermarket sector. Suppliers of boutique WRH replacements can be found in the US and the UK. Some pick-up specialists also offer a re-winding / rebuilding service designed to return the reissue pickup to the original Seth Lover specifications.

2010 Fender Custom Shop Q1 Limited 72 Telecaster Custom 
In 2010 the Fender Custom Shop released a limited issue of 30 '72 Telecaster Custom relics. While they used some of the original '72 design features such as the three-bolt neck and the classic look, these guitars had many more differences from the originals. The body is made of ash and features a belly cut. The neck is one piece maple with a flatter 9.5-inch radius and larger 6105 frets. The headstock has the original design "Custom" logo. The neck pickup is a custom wound wide-range humbucker. Alnico 2 magnets were used which more closely resemble the sound of the CuNiFe magnets used in the original Seth Lover pickup (I have only been able to verify this with a phone call to Fenders customer service). The bridge pickup is a "hot nocaster". The overwound pickup has more output which better matches the output of the neck pickup. These guitars are distinguished from production reissues by a "Custom Shop Limited Edition" logo on the back of the headstock and also on the neck plate.

2011 Fender American Vintage Reissue 72 Telecaster Custom 
In 2011, Fender released the American Vintage reissue '72 Telecaster Custom, replicating the original '72 design features such as the three-bolt neck and the classic look, with improved construction and quality.

In particular, the American Vintage ’72 Telecaster Custom includes a solid ash body with gloss lacquer finish; a C-shaped neck with gloss lacquer finish; maple fingerboard; American Vintage single-coil telecaster bridge pickup, Fender wide range humbucker in the neck, a three-position switch with aged white tip, and a vintage-style three-saddle strings-through-body telecaster bridge.

Notes

References
 

Fender Telecasters